Avro was a British aircraft manufacturer. Its designs include the Avro 504, used as a trainer in the First World War, the Avro Lancaster, one of the pre-eminent bombers of the Second World War, and the delta wing Avro Vulcan, a stalwart of the Cold War.

Avro was founded in 1910 by Alliott Verdon Roe at the Brownsfield Mill on Great Ancoats Street in Manchester. The company remained based primarily in Lancashire throughout its 53 years of existence, with key development and manufacturing sites in Alexandra Park, Chadderton, Trafford Park, and Woodford, Greater Manchester. The company was merged into Hawker Siddeley Aviation in 1963, although the Avro name has been used for some aircraft since then.

History

Early history

One of the world's first aircraft builders, A.V. Roe and Company was established on 1 January 1910 at Brownsfield Mill, Great Ancoats Street, Manchester, by Alliott Verdon Roe and his brother Humphrey Verdon Roe. Humphrey's contribution was chiefly financial and organizational; funding it from the earnings of the family webbing business and acting as managing director until he joined the RFC in 1917. Alliot had already constructed a successful aircraft, the Roe I Triplane, named The Bullseye after a brand of braces manufactured by Humphrey. The railway arch where A.V. Roe in 1909 built and achieved the first all-British powered flight still stands in the Lee Valley Park in Hackney. In 1911, Roy Chadwick began work as Alliott's personal assistant and the firm's draughtsman and, in 1918, he was appointed Chief Designer.

The first Avro aircraft to be produced in any quantity was the Avro E or Avro 500, first flown in March 1912, of which 18 were manufactured, most for the newly formed Royal Flying Corps. The company also built the world's first aircraft with enclosed crew accommodation in 1912, the monoplane Type F and the biplane Avro Type G in 1912, neither progressing beyond the prototype stage. The Type 500 was developed into the Avro 504, first flown in September 1913. A small number were bought by the War Office before the outbreak of World War I, and the type saw some front-line service in the early months of the war, but it is best known as a training aircraft, serving in that role until 1933. Production lasted 20 years and totalled 8,340 aircraft from several factories: Hamble, Failsworth, Miles Platting and Newton Heath.

Interwar years
After the boom in orders during the First World War, the lack of new work in peacetime caused severe financial problems and in August 1920, 68.5% of the company's shares were acquired by nearby Crossley Motors which had an urgent need for more factory space for automotive vehicle body building. 

In 1924, the company left Alexandra Park Aerodrome in south Manchester where test flying had taken place since 1918; the site was used for a mixture of recreation and housing development. A rural site to the south of the city was found at New Hall Farm, Woodford in Cheshire, which continued to be used by aviation company BAE Systems until March 2011; the site has now been earmarked for a mixed use development. 

In 1928 Crossley Motors sold AVRO to Armstrong Siddeley Holdings Ltd.  In 1928 A.V. Roe resigned from the company he had founded and formed the Saunders-Roe company, which after World War II developed several radical designs for combat jets, and, eventually, a range of powerful hovercraft. 

In 1935 Avro became a subsidiary of Hawker Siddeley.

Second World War

Maintaining their skills in designing trainer aircraft, the company built a more robust biplane called the Avro Tutor in the 1930s which the Royal Air Force (RAF) also bought in quantity. A twin piston-engined airliner called the Anson followed but as tensions rose again in Europe the firm's emphasis returned to combat aircraft. The Avro Manchester, Lancaster, and Lincoln were particularly famous Avro designs. Over 7,000 Lancasters were built and their bombing capabilities led to their use in the famous Dam Busters raid. Of the total, nearly half were built at Avro's Woodford (Stockport) and Chadderton (Oldham) sites, with some 700 Lancasters built at the Avro "shadow" factory next to Leeds Bradford Airport (formerly Yeadon Aerodrome), northwest Leeds. This factory employed 17,500 workers at a time when the population of Yeadon was just 10,000. The old taxiway from the factory to the runway is still evident.

The Avro Lancaster carried the heaviest bomb loads of the war, including the Grand Slam bomb.

Postwar developments

The civilian Lancastrian and maritime reconnaissance Shackleton were derived from the successful Lancaster design. The Tudor was a pressurised but problematic post-war Avro airliner which faced strong competition from designs by Bristol, Canadair, Douglas, Handley Page, and Lockheed. With the same wings and engines as the Lincoln, it achieved only a short (34 completed) production run following a first flight in June 1945 and the cancellation of an order from BOAC. The older Avro York was somewhat more successful in both the RAF and in commercial service, being distinguished by a fuselage square in cross-section. Both Tudors and Yorks played an important humanitarian part in the Berlin Airlift.

The postwar Vulcan bomber, originally designed as a nuclear-strike aircraft, was used to maintain the British nuclear deterrent, armed with the Avro Blue Steel stand-off nuclear bomb. The Vulcan saw service as a conventional bomber during the British campaign to recapture the Falkland Islands in 1982. Several Vulcans are prized as museum exhibits.

A twin turboprop airliner, the Avro 748, was developed during the 1950s and sold widely to airlines and governments across the globe, powered by two Rolls-Royce Dart engines. The RAF bought 6 for use by the Queen's Flight and a variant with a rear-loading ramp and a "kneeling" main undercarriage was sold to the RAF (31 aircraft) as the Andover.

Avro regional jets

The Avro name would subsequently be resurrected by British Aerospace when this aircraft manufacturer renamed its BAe 146 family of regional jetliners as Avro regional jets (Avro RJ).  Three differently sized versions of the four engine jetliner were produced:  the Avro RJ70, the Avro RJ85 and the largest example, the Avro RJ100.

Avro Canada

In 1945, Hawker Siddeley Group purchased the former Victory Aircraft firm in Malton, Ontario, and renamed the operation A.V. Roe Canada Limited. Commonly known as Avro Canada, it was actually a subsidiary of the Hawker Siddeley Group and used the Avro name for trading purposes.

Amalgamation
When the company was absorbed into Hawker Siddeley Aviation in July 1963 following the 1957 Defence White Paper, the Avro name ceased to be used. The brand still had a strong heritage appeal, and as mentioned above the marketing name "Avro RJ" (regional jet) was used by British Aerospace from 1994 to 2001 for production of the RJ70, RJ85 and RJ100 models which were respectively based on the BAe 146-100, BAe 146-200 and BAe 146-300. This four engine jet aircraft type is sometimes also loosely called the "Avro 146".

The BAe ATP (Advanced Turbo Prop) design evolved from the Avro 748 and examples continue in use on shorter, mainly domestic, scheduled air services. A few Avro 504s, Tutors, Ansons and Lancasters are maintained in flying condition. At 39 years, the Shackleton held the distinction of being the aircraft with the longest period of active RAF service, until overtaken by the English Electric Canberra in 1998.

Avro aeroplanes
Roe I Biplane
Roe I Triplane
Roe II Triplane (Also known as the Mercury)
Roe III Triplane
Roe IV Triplane
Avro Type D
Avro Curtiss type (Also known as the Lakes Water Bird)
Avro Duigan
Avro 500 (Type E)
Roe-Burga monoplane
Avro Type F
Avro Type G
Avro 501 (Type H)
Avro 502
Avro 503 (Type H)
Avro 504
Avro 508
Avro 510
Avro 511
Avro 514
Avro 519
Avro 521
Avro 523 Pike
Avro 527
Avro 528
Avro 529
Avro 530
Avro 531 Spider
Avro 533 Manchester
Avro 534 Baby
Avro 536
Avro 538
Avro 539
Avro 540
Avro 543 Baby
Avro 545
Avro 546
Avro 547
Avro 548 Tourist
Avro 549 Aldershot
Avro 551
Avro 552
Avro 554
Avro 555 Bison
Avro 557 Ava
Avro 558
Avro 560
Avro 561 Andover
Avro 562 Avis
Avro 563
Avro 566 Avenger
Avro 567 Avenger II
Avro 571 Buffalo
Avro 572 Buffalo II
Avro 581 Avian
Avro 582
Avro 584 Avocet
Avro 585
Avro 594 Avian
Avro 604 Antelope
Avro 616 Sports Avian
Avro 618 Ten
Avro 619 Five
Avro 621 Tutor
Avro 623
Avro 624 Six
Avro 625 Avian Monoplane
Avro 626
Avro 627 Mailplane
Avro 631 Cadet
Avro 637
Avro 638 Club Cadet (1933)
Avro 641 Commodore (1935)
Avro 642 Eighteen
Avro 643 Cadet
Avro 646 Sea Tutor
Avro 652
Avro 652A Anson (1935)
Avro 654
Avro 661
Avro 667
Avro 674 – 24 modernised Hawker Audaxes built for the Egyptian government.
Avro 679 Manchester (1939)
Avro 683 Lancaster (1941)
Avro Lancaster PA474
List of Avro Lancaster operators
List of surviving Avro Lancasters
Avro 685 York (1942)
Avro 688 Tudor (1945)
Avro 689 Tudor
Avro 691 Lancastrian (1943)
Avro 694 Lincoln (1944)
Avro 695 Lincolnian (1949)
Avro 696 Shackleton (1949)
Avro 698 Vulcan (1952)
Avro Vulcan XH558
Avro Vulcan XM655
Avro 701 Athena (1948)
Avro 707 (1949)
Avro 706 Ashton (1950)
Avro 748 (1960) – became the HS 748 and BAe 748, developed as the Hawker Siddeley Andover (HS.780), and later as the BAe ATP

Unbuilt projects
Avro 505 – skipped
Avro 506/Type J – twin-float pusher seaplane gun carrier
Avro 507 – reserved for a set of mailplanes
Avro 509 – originally for a set of tanks and struts for the Walsh flying boat; re-used for unbuilt proposed twin-engine tractor biplane seaplane
Avro 512 – land-based single-engine biplane
Avro 513 – proposed twin-engine tractor biplane seaplane
Avro 515 – biplane
Avro 516 – tractor monoplane
Avro 517 – biplane version of Type 516
Avro 518 – single-seat tractor aircraft
Avro 520 – single-seat landplane for RNAS
Avro 522 – modified Type 519 with larger but equal-span wings
Avro 524 – scout aircraft
Avro 525 – single-seat ground attack aircraft for spec. AM Class II
Avro 526 – Type 525 with monoplane tail
Avro 535 – long-range biplane to compete for the "Daily Mail" transatlantic prize
Avro 537 – 10-passenger biplane airliner
Avro 541 – twin-float reconnaissance seaplane for RAF spec. XXI
Avro 542 – projected 6-seat airliner
Avro 544 – two-seat version of Type 534
Avro 550 – proposed reconnaissance triplane for spec. 37/22
Avro 550 – projected three-engine 15-passenger European transport for spec. 40/22
Avro 553 – proposed version of Type 548 with enclosed cabin
Avro 556 – single-engine torpedo bomber design for spec. 16/22; developed into Type 557
Avro 557 – single-seat, single-engine monoplane
Avro 559 – single-seat light monoplane for the Lympne Trials, not built; replaced by Type 560
Avro 564 – two-seat monoplane fighter with thick section elliptical wing
Avro 565 – Type 564 with Napier Lion engine
Avro 568 – all-metal single-seat fighter
Avro 569 – Avenger with RAF.30 section wings, not built
Avro 573 – commercial trimotor biplane to spec. 26/24 for Imperial Airways
Avro 577 – general purpose land-based biplane
Avro 578 – seaplane version of Type 577
Avro 579 – Avis with RAF.15 section wings
Avro 580 – private venture trimotor biplane heavy bomber
Avro 583 – Avenger II with Napier Lion IX engine
Avro 588 – Avian modified as monoplane racer
Avro 589 – floatplane version of Avian
Avro 590 – two-seat Army co-operation biplane to Australian spec
Avro 591 – two-seat fighter version of Type 590
Avro 592 – seaplane version of Type 590
Avro 593 – two-seat seaplane fighter version of Type 592
Avro 595 – "CN.2"; two-seat land/seaplane for spec. O.22/26
Avro 596 – "CN.1"; three-seat bomber version of Type 595
Avro 597 – two-seat land-based bomber of Buffalo I
Avro 598 Warregull I – two-seat trainer for Australia
Avro 599 Warregull II – redesigned Type 598
Avro 600 – Avian III with RAF.15 section wings
Avro 601 – two-seat reconnaissance biplane
Avro 602 – modified version of Avenger
Avro 603 – 8-passenger monoplane airliner to Australian spec.
Avro 606 – three-engine monoplane maritime patrol flying boat for spec. 4/27
Avro 607 – Type 606 with round-section hull
Avro 608 Hawk – two-seat biplane fighter based on the Antelope; re-worked into Type 622 during construction
Avro 610 Saloon – five-seat high-wing cabin monoplane
Avro 613 – twin-engine monoplane night bomber for spec. B.19/27
Avro 614 – three-engine high-wing airliner
Avro 615 – Type 614 with two Jaguar IV engines
Avro 622 Hawk – Type 608 with Panther II engine; converted to Type 627 during construction
Avro 626 – low-wing sports monoplane
Avro 628 Five Mk. III – Mail plane version of Type 619
Avro 629 – Mail plane version of Type 618 for spec. 21/28
Avro 630 – day bomber version of Type 627
Avro 632 – fleet torpedo bomber/reconnaissance biplane for spec. S.9/30
Avro 633 Cadet Fighter – projected version of Type 631
Avro 634 – two-seat low-wing sports monoplane
Avro 635 – three-seat low-wing cabin monoplane
Avro 636 – two-seat biplane fighter; closely resembled the Armstrong-Whitworth Scimitar
Avro 644 – 2-seat reconnaissance/bomber developed from the Type 637
Avro 645 – six-seat, twin-engine, low-wing airliner
Avro 647 – six-seat, twin-engine, low-wing airliner
Avro 648 – six-seat, twin-engine, low-wing airliner
Avro 649 – 17-seat, four-engine airliner
Avro 650 Eight – eight-seat version of Type 642
Avro 651 – trimotor monoplane
Avro 653 – long-range shipborne biplane seaplane
Avro 655 – twin-engine bomber
Avro 656 – low-wing version of Type 655
Avro 657 Tiger Fighter – military variant of Type 654
Avro 658 – three-seat low-wing monoplane
Avro 659 – scaled down high-wing version of Type 652
Avro 660 – low-wing version of Type 659, only a mockup built
Avro 662 – improved version of Type 621, redesignated to Type 669
Avro 663 Cadet Trainer – Type 643 with Genet Major engine
Avro 664 – alternative design to Type 652A 
Avro 666 – single-engine biplane bomber for spec. O.27/34; prototype ordered but cancelled
Avro 668 – twin-engine cabin autogiro
Avro 669 – improved version of Type 621
Avro 670 – proposed army co-operation sesquiplane for spec. A.39/34
Avro 672 – twin-engine reconnaissance monoplane for spec. G.24/35
Avro 673 – twin-engine advanced gunnery trainer
Avro 675 – reconnaissance monoplane for specs. G.24/35 and M.15/35
Avro 676 – advanced trainer for spec. T.6/36
Avro 677 – alternate version of Type 676 with rear gun turret
Avro 678 – a curious fighter project that saw a R-R Merlin mounted in the fuselage driving wing-mounted airscrew propellers
Avro 680 – four-engine heavy bomber for spec. B.1/39
Avro 681 – heavy bomber project
Avro 682 – heavy bomber project
Avro 684 – proposed high-altitude pressurized bomber based on the Lancaster
Avro 685B – long-range flying boat transport
Avro 695 Lincolnian – transport conversion of Lincoln
Avro 686 – proposed high-altitude Lancaster replacement
Avro 687 – Avro XX; projected Empire route airliner based on the Lincoln for spec. 29/43
Avro 690 – Avro XXII; transatlantic six-engine airliner for spec. Brabazon Type 3A
Avro 692 – Avro XXIII; projected six-engine transatlantic airliner for spec. Brabazon Type 3
Avro 693 – projected Empire route turbojet airliner for spec. Brabazon Type 3A
Avro 697 – medium-range 48 passenger airliner for Empire route to spec. 2/47
Avro 699 – version of Type 689 with tricycle landing gear and broad chord fin for BEA to carry 60 passengers 
Avro 700 – 12 passenger transport to replace Anson
Avro 702 – aircrew trainer for Canada
Avro 703 – proposed 36 passenger turbojet airliner for Trans-Canada Airlines
Avro 704 – two-seat advanced aircrew trainer
Avro 704B – version of Type 704 based on Athena
Avro 705 – 36 passenger turbojet airliner based on Type 688 with tricycle landing gear
Avro 706 – lengthened version of Type 705
Avro 708 – 60 passenger long-range airliner
Avro 709 – long-range transport based on Tudor II
Avro 710 – delta-wing research aircraft for Type 698 development, 1/10 scale model of Type 698
Avro 711 – version of Tudor 4 as a 36 passenger airliner/freighter
Avro 711A Trader – freighter version of Tudor 4 for spec. 23/48
Avro 712 – meteorological aircraft based on Lincoln II to OR.259
Avro 713 – version of Type 712 based on Shackleton
Avro 714 – single-engine basic trainer to spec. T.16/48, based on Athena
Avro 715 – 8-10 passenger, four-engine airliner to replace Rapide
Avro 716 Shackleton Mk.3 – projected development of Type 696, redesigned as Type 719
Avro 717 – Lincolnian flying test bed
Avro 718 – delta-wing military transport based on Type 698
Avro 719 – re-engined Type 716; redesignated Shackleton Mk.4 in 1953
Avro 720 – planned rocket interceptor, to OR.301 as for the SR.53. Cancelled before flight.
Avro 721 – proposed low-level bomber for spec. B.126T
Avro 722 Atlantic –proposed airliner version of the Vulcan
Avro 723 – DC-3 replacement
Avro 724 – Project Y; alternative for Avrocar, tail-sitting VTOL
Avro 725 – advanced trainer version of Type 720 to OR.318
Avro 726 – single-engine lightweight fighter version of Type 720
Avro 727 – NATO ground attack aircraft based on Type 720
Avro 728 – naval version of Type 720
Avro 729 – single-seat fighter to OR.329
Avro 730 – supersonic stainless steel canard bomber for spec. B.156T (later R.156T), never completed
Avro 731 – planned 3/8 scale model of Avro 730
Avro 732 – planned supersonic version of Avro Vulcan
Avro 734 – planned long-range decoy air-launched by Vulcans
Avro 735 – proposed 100 passenger supersonic airliner based on Type 730
Avro 736 – 30-54 seat transport
Avro 737 – STOL transport version of Type 736
Avro 738 – staged weapon system
Avro 739 – low-level supersonic strike aircraft to OR.339
Avro 740 – proposed 70-seat trijet airliner with a V-tail; became the Trident
Avro 741 – executive/feederliner with a butterfly tail
Avro 742 – jet-engined military transport
Avro 743 – long-range turboprop military transport
Avro 744 – nuclear powered aircraft study
Avro 745 – maritime patrol aircraft to NATO requirements
Avro 746 – jet flap research aircraft
Avro 747 – turboprop transport based on Type 737
Avro 749 – VTOL 40 passenger transport for BEA
Avro 750 – short-range 80 passenger transport
Avro 751 – three-engine airliner
Avro 752 – VTOL assault aircraft
Avro 753 – freighter with Type 745 wing
Avro 754 – low-wing 65-80 passenger airliner version of Type 753
Avro 755 – 40 passenger STOL transport with deflected slipstream system
Avro 756 – long-range military transport as Type 743 replacement to same spec. as Short Belfast
Avro 757 – version of 748 Srs. I with strengthened floor and revised avionics for Indian Air Force, also known as Type 748M
Avro 758 – high-wing version of Type 748; also known as Type 748R
Avro 759 – slender delta research aircraft
Avro 760 – supersonic airliner (Concorde spec.)
Avro 761 – 77 passenger airliner to replace Viscount
Avro 762 – advanced weapon system
Avro 763 – VTOL fan-lift "Jeep"
Avro 764 – VTOL version of AW.650
Avro 765 – VTOL fan-lift fighter
Avro 766 – four-engine turbojet long-range military transport
Avro 767 – joint airliner project with Bristol to Trident spec.
Avro 768 – carrier-borne early warning aircraft based on Type 748 to Naval spec. NA.107T
Avro 769 – VTOL weapons system based on the Vulcan
Avro 770 – STOL assault transport based on Type 758 using the deflected slipstream technique
Avro 771 – proposed 60-seat airliner of Type 761 powered by two Bristol Siddeley BS.75 turbofans
Avro 772 – car ferry/90 passenger transport with tail and outer wing sections from Type 748
Avro 773 – STOL military freighter
Avro 774 – long endurance weapons system
Avro 775 – maritime reconnaissance aircraft to OR.350
Avro 776 – Type 775 to spec. AST.357
Avro 777 – reserved for appropriate special project, but not used
Avro 778 – jet engine, 50 passenger version of Type 748; also known as Type 748J
Avro 779 – high-wing STOL transport using Type 748 components
Avro 781 – shortened version of Type 778 for 24-32 passengers
Avro 782 – shortened version of Type 780; originally designated as Type 748S
Avro 783 – STOL version of Type 780 to NATO requirements
Avro 784 – four-engine maritime reconnaissance aircraft to AST.357
Avro 785-799 – not used

Rotorcraft
Avro 574/575 – Cierva C.6
Avro 586/587/611 – Cierva C.8
Avro 576/581 – Cierva C.9
Avro 612 – Cierva C.17
Avro 620 – Cierva C.19
Avro 671 Rota – Cierva C.30
Avro 665 – Cierva C.33
Avro 668 – Cierva C.38
Cierva C.12 – fitted with floats to become the 'Hydrogiro'

Avro Canada
Avro Canada C102 Jetliner
Avro Canada CF-100 Canuck
Avro Canada CF-103
Avro Canada CF-105 Arrow
Avro Canada TS-140
Avro Canada VZ-9 Avrocar

Unbuilt projects
Avro Canada CF-103 (mock-up only)
Avro Canada Project Y-1 (mock-up only)
Avro Canada Project Y-2 (scale test models only)
Avro Canada PV-704 (built as engine test model only)
Avro Canada TS-140

Missiles
Blue Steel missile

Car production
Avro also built motor vehicles in the immediate post-World War 1 era, including the three-wheeler Harper Runabout, as well as their own light car. Powered by a 1,330 cc 4-cylinder engine, wood and aluminium were used in an integral construction similar to an aircraft. Approximately 100 were built.

In 1927 Alliott Verdon-Roe designed a two-wheeler car powered by a 350 cc Villiers air-cooled engine. An outrigger wheel kept the car upright when stationary. The Mobile did not go into production.

Football
Avro F.C. was founded at the Chadderton factory and still exists today.

See also 
Aerospace industry in the United Kingdom

References

Citations

Sources 

 Baldwin, Nick. A-Z of Cars of the 1920s. Bideford, Devon, England: Bay View Books, 1998. .
 Campagna, Palmiro.  Requiem For a Giant:  A.V. Roe Canada and the Avro Arrow. Toronto, Ontario; Oxford, England:  Dundurn Press, 2003. 
 Harlin, E.A. and G.A. Jenks.  Avro: An Aircraft Album. Shepperton, Middlesex, UK: Ian Allan, 1973. .
 Holmes, Harry. Avro: The History of an Aircraft Company. Wiltshire, UK: Crowood Press, 2004. .
 Jackson, Aubrey J. Avro Aircraft since 1908. London, England: Putnam, 1965. .
 Molson, Ken M. and Harold A. Taylor.  Canadian Aircraft since 1909.  Toronto, Ontario: Putnam, 1982. .
 Wood, Derek. Project Cancelled: British Aircraft That Never Flew. New York, NY: The Bobbs-Merrill Company, Inc., 1975. .

External links

 AV Roe & Company at BAE Systems website
 A.V. Roe and Company (Avro)
 A. V. Roe, 1877–1958
 

Defunct aircraft manufacturers of the United Kingdom
Vintage vehicles
Defunct motor vehicle manufacturers of the United Kingdom
Aviation in Lancashire
Hawker Siddeley
Defunct companies based in Manchester
Manufacturing companies established in 1910
Manufacturing companies disestablished in 1963
1910 establishments in England
1963 disestablishments in England
1963 mergers and acquisitions